Louis Proost (7 April 1935 in Halle – 2 February 2009) was a Belgian professional road bicycle racer, who became world amateur champion in 1957. In the 1960 Tour de France, he won one stage.

Major results

1957
 World Amateur road race Championship
1958
Brasschaat
Sint-Niklaas
Brussels–Ingooigem
Zwijndrecht
Rummen
1959
Boulogne-sur-Mer
Oostende
Glabbeek
Turnhout
Rijkevorsel
1960
Ekeren
Bruxelles – Charleroi – Bruxelles
Wuustwezel
Tour de France:
Winner stage 13
1961
Borgerhout
Waasmunster
Edegem
Melle
Giro d'Itala:
Winner stage 5
1962
Beringen
Hoeilaart-Diest-Hoeilaart
Nieuwkerken-Waas
Polder-Kempen
Oedelem
Turnhout
Zandhoven
Sint-Amands
1963
Beveren-Waas
Hoeilaart-Diest-Hoeilaart
Omloop van West-Brabant
Schoten – Willebroek
Sint-Truiden
Rijmenam
Mouscron
Edegem
Zandhoven
Wetteren
1964
Tervuren
Bierbeek
Melle
Mortsel
Tessenderlo
Lommel
Kontich
1965
Polderpijl
Zwijndrecht
Kontich
1966
Beveren-Waas
Omloop van Midden-Vlaanderen
Diksmuide

External links 

Official Tour de France results for Louis Proost

1935 births
2009 deaths
Belgian male cyclists
Belgian Tour de France stage winners
Belgian Giro d'Italia stage winners
People from Halle, Belgium
Cyclists from Flemish Brabant
20th-century Belgian people